Mount Auburn Historic District is located in the Mount Auburn neighborhood of Cincinnati, Ohio. It extends along both sides of Auburn Avenue roughly between Ringold Street and William H. Taft Road. The population of Mount Auburn was 5,094 at the 2020 census.

The District was placed on the National Register of Historic Places on March 28, 1973 (No. 73001464). Mount Auburn was founded as a hilltop retreat for Cincinnati's social elite where wealthier people could escape the dirt, heat, smoke and crowded conditions of the lower city. Ornate historic mansions with incredible panoramic views still reflect this heritage.

The district contains notable houses of Federal, Greek Revival, Italian Villa, Romanesque Revival, and Georgian Revival styles. The houses date from 1819 to the turn of the century and are associated with the prominent Cincinnatians. Noted residents include President William Howard Taft.

Demographics

Source - City of Cincinnati Statistical Database

History
Mt. Auburn was for a long time almost the only suburb of the city. It was at first called Keys' Hill, after an old settler, and this name was used until 1837. By 1826 a number of prominent citizens had taken up residence there.

Mount Auburn was platted as a town in 1837. It owes its name to the then newly established Mount Auburn Cemetery of Boston.  By 1842, it extended from Liberty Street (Liberty Street got its name because the city laws were not enforced north of it and it was the location of the "northern liberties" – gambling, drinking and carousing) to McMillan Street (note that the historic district only goes as far south as Ringold Street, the rest of the Mount Auburn neighborhood to the south is the Prospect Hill Historic District). Mount Auburn was annexed to the City of Cincinnati in 1849.

Television
Mount Auburn is the main major television broadcast facility location for the Cincinnati area.

Stations that transmit from Mount Auburn:

WLWT has their studios on Young Street, and their transmitter on Chickasaw Street

WKRC-TV has studios and Transmitter located on Highland Avenue.

WCPO-TV has their transmitter on Symes Street, the tower also holds WBQC-LD.

WCET (TV) has their transmitter located on Chickasaw Street with WLWT.

Buildings and sites
William Howard Taft National Historic Site
The Mount Auburn Young Ladies Institute was established in 1856 to provide higher education to females. It was known for a strenuous curriculum, particularly in science and mathematics. The Institute was located on twenty-three acres of land that was landscaped by a gardener. Only four acres were cultivated for vegetable and flower gardens and a fruit orchard. The remainder was part of the landscaped area.
Cincinnati Orphan Asylum
Hopkins Park is a small hillside park in Mt. Auburn
Inwood Park was created in 1904 after the purchase of a stone quarry. Its pavilion, built in 1910 in Mission style, is one of the earliest buildings extant in Cincinnati's parks.
Jackson Hill Park
Glencoe-Auburn Hotel and Glencoe-Auburn Place Row Houses
Prospect Hill

Other notable architecture
 Mount Auburn Presbyterian Church, 103 William Howard Taft Road
 Former First District School, 412 Liberty Hill
 Mt. Auburn Cable Railway Building, Corner of Highland and Dorchester
 The William Howard Doane House (Sunny Side), 2223 Auburn Avenue
 Mt. Auburn Baptist Church, 2147 Auburn Avenue
 Adam Riddle House, 2021 Auburn Avenue
 The Henry Powell House, 2209 Auburn Avenue

Schools
 God's Bible School and College
 Mount Auburn Preparatory Academy
 William Howard Taft Elementary
 Christ College of Nursing

Medical institutions
 The Christ Hospital
 Planned Parenthood Elizabeth Campbell Surgical Center

Commentary

Gallery

References

External links

Mt. Auburn Community Website
William Howard Taft National Historic Site (National Park Service)
Mount Auburn Historic District
Map Mount Auburn Historic District

Historic districts in Cincinnati
National Register of Historic Places in Cincinnati
Neighborhoods in Cincinnati
Historic districts on the National Register of Historic Places in Ohio